Dan Able Kimball (March 1, 1896 – July 30, 1970) was the 51st U.S. Secretary of the Navy.

Biography
Kimball was born in St. Louis, Missouri, on March 1, 1896. He was an Army Air Service pilot during the First World War and maintained an intense interest in aviation thereafter. Beginning in 1920, he was employed by the General Tire and Rubber Company, rising to Vice President of that firm in 1942. He subsequently was an executive of the rocket engine producer Aerojet Engineering Company, a division of General Tire. He was appointed Assistant Secretary of the Navy for Air in February 1949 and became Under Secretary of the Navy the following May.

Kimball assumed the post of Secretary of the Navy in July 1951 and held that position until the end of the Truman Administration in January 1953. His tenure was marked by the continuation of the Korean War, the resulting expansion of the nation's defense establishment and considerable technological progress in aviation, naval engineering and other defense-related fields. Returning to business after leaving office, he was President and later Chairman of the Board of the Aerojet General Corporation until 1969. He died on July 30, 1970.

See also

References

1896 births
1970 deaths
People from St. Louis
Military personnel from Missouri
United States Secretaries of the Navy
United States Army officers
United States Army Air Service pilots of World War I
American Congregationalists
United States Under Secretaries of the Navy
United States Assistant Secretaries of the Navy